Wolens is a surname. Notable people with the surname include:

Doug Wolens, American documentary filmmaker, writer, and producer 
Steven D. Wolens (born 1950), American politician